Allison Balson is an American actress who is also a published singer and songwriter. Her best-known role was that of Nancy Oleson on the Little House on the Prairie series which she held between 1981 and 1983.

Biography 
Balson portrayed Chrissy Roberts in the syndicated TV drama The Life and Times of Eddie Roberts (1980). She also appeared in the film Best Seller (1987).

In 1987, Balson's song "I Wonder" was featured in the soundtrack for Legend of the White Horse (CBS/Warner Bros.). In 2005, Balson recorded and released a limited-edition CD. In 2008, she collaborated on writing, producing, engineering, and performing a full-length album through the label Organic Time Records as the duo Allison & Stone. In 2012, Allison began hosting and producing the radio show Music Scene Live, which brings original music of singer-songwriters in live performance and candid dialogue in front of a live audience.

In spring 2018, Balson won the title of The Voice of The Ocean on an Emerald Princess Cruise. 

She continues to act, sing, publish and write, produce and create films, television and radio projects.

Filmography

Film

Television

References

External links

Official website
Music Scene Live Homepage

Living people
American child actresses
American women singer-songwriters
Princeton University alumni
Alumni of Trinity College Dublin
20th-century American actresses
21st-century American actresses
American television actresses
American film actresses
Actresses from Los Angeles
American radio personalities
American radio producers
20th-century American singers
20th-century American women singers
Women radio producers
Year of birth missing (living people)